The 2017–18 Eintracht Braunschweig season was the 124th season in the club's football history. In 2017–18 the club competed the 2. Bundesliga, the second tier of German football.

Review and events

The 2017–18 season of Eintracht Braunschweig began on 26 June 2017 with their first training session.

The draw for the first round of the 2017–18 DFB-Pokal happened on 11 June and paired Braunschweig with fellow 2. Bundesliga team Holstein Kiel.

On 7 July 2017, the team headed for a ten-day-long pre-season training camp in Herxheim bei Landau/Pfalz, Rhineland-Palatinate.

On 25 July 2017, Ken Reichel was named captain of the team.

On 4 August 2017, the club announced that Daniel Ischdonat would temporarily replace the injured Alexander Kunze as goalkeeping coach.

Matches and results

Legend

Friendly matches

2. Bundesliga

League table

Results summary

Results by round

Matches

DFB-Pokal

Squad

Current squad

Transfers

Summer

In:

Out:

Player statistics

|}

Management and coaching staff 

Since 12 May 2008 Torsten Lieberknecht is the manager of Eintracht Braunschweig.

References

External links 
Eintracht Braunschweig Official Website

Eintracht Braunschweig seasons
Braunschweig